Cellio con Breia is a comune (municipality) in the Province of Vercelli in the Italian region Piedmont, established on 1 January 2018 by the merger of the former comuni of Breia and Cellio, in the lower Valsesia.

References